Blood Run is an album by Unsane. It was released on April 26, 2005, through Relapse Records. It was the first album released by the group after their reformation in 2003.

Reception

Eduardo Rivadavia from AllMusic called it "a frightening place where every word uttered is a ragged scream, guitars clang against drums like hammers upon anvils, and unnerving shards of melody echo from standout tracks like 'Backslide', 'Killing Time', and 'Latch'" and "an excellent and surprisingly seamless addition to the band's canon."

Track listing
 "Back Slide" – 4:11
 "Release" – 2:35
 "Killing Time" – 4:55
 "Got It Down" – 3:42
 "Make Them Prey" – 4:21
 "Hammered Out" – 4:43
 "D Train" – 2:19
 "Anything" – 3:27
 "Recovery" – 3:45
 "Latch" – 2:42
 "Dead Weight" – 7:03

Credits
Chris Spencer – guitar, vocals, photography
Dave Curran – bass, vocals
Vincent Signorelli – drums
Alan Douches – mastering
Joel Hamilton – guitar solo on "Latch", producer, engineer
Orion Landau – design
James Rexroad – photography

References

Unsane albums
2005 albums